The 1995 Clásica de Almería was the 10th edition of the Clásica de Almería cycle race and was held on 28 February 1995. The race was won by Jean-Pierre Heynderickx.

General classification

References

1995
1995 in road cycling
1995 in Spanish sport